Hanford Mills Museum, also known as Kelso Mill, is a historic grist mill and sawmill and national historic district located at East Meredith, New York in Delaware County, New York. The district contains nine contributing buildings and three contributing structures.  The complex includes both natural and structural facilities.  It includes a mill race from Kortright Creek to the damned up Mill Pond which supplies the waterwheel, a spillway for the pond's overflow, a section of old (1900) New York Central Railroad track, two railroad bridges crossing Kortright Creek, and a variety of buildings.  The main structure is a mill building dating to the 1820s with additions from the 1870s, 1880s, and 1890s. The four story wood-frame structure is approximately 150 feet long and 120 feet high.  Also on the property is a one-story depot building with grain elevator and storage facilities. It is now operated as a museum. It was listed on the National Register of Historic Places in 1973.

See also
National Register of Historic Places listings in Delaware County, New York

References

External links
Hanford Mills Museum website

National Register of Historic Places in Delaware County, New York
Museums in Delaware County, New York
Industrial buildings completed in 1820
Mill museums in New York (state)
History museums in New York (state)
Historic districts in Delaware County, New York
Grinding mills in New York (state)
Historic districts on the National Register of Historic Places in New York (state)
Grinding mills on the National Register of Historic Places in New York (state)